{{DISPLAYTITLE:Rhaetian Railway Ge 6/6 I}}

The Rhaetian Railway Ge 6/6 I is a class of metre gauge C′C′ electric locomotives operated by the Rhaetian Railway (RhB), which is the main railway network in the Canton of Graubünden, Switzerland.

The class is so named because it was the first class of locomotives of the Swiss locomotive and railcar classification type Ge 6/6 to be acquired by the Rhaetian Railway. According to that classification system, Ge 6/6 denotes a narrow gauge electric adhesion locomotive with a total of six axles, all of which are drive axles.

Due to their shape – they are similar in form to the SBB-CFF-FFS Crocodiles of the Gotthard Railway – the Ge 6/6 I locomotives have also collectively been nicknamed the Rhaetian Crocodiles by rail fans.  Their internal working RhB designation is C-C.  As with its standard-gauge counterpart, the Ge 6/6  is articulated, with a gear-driven Jackshaft between the two end axles of each unit, connected to the drive wheels by side rods.

History 

Following the electrification of the Albula Railway in 1919, the Rhaetian Railway needed to acquire more electric locomotives.  That need was met by the acquisition of six locomotives of a new class Ge 6/6, numbered 401 to 406.  Manufacturers were Swiss Locomotive and Machine Works (SLM), Brown, Boveri & Cie (BBC) and Maschinenfabrik Oerlikon (MFO).

The introduction of electric operations on the line from Landquart to Davos Platz similarly necessitated the introduction of new locomotives more powerful than the Ge 2/4 and Ge 4/6 class locos already in service.  In the wake of the first Ge 6/6 deliveries in 1921, further deliveries of locomotives in the class were made as follows: nos. 407 to 410 in 1922, nos. 411 and 412 in 1925, and nos. 413 to 415 in 1929.

With the 15 new Ge 6/6 locomotives, the Rhaetian Railway was able completely to replace the steam locomotives on its core network.  Henceforth, the Ge 6/6s hauled the heavy and headline trains, including the Glacier Express.

The 15 Ge 6/6 locomotives placed into service with the numbers 401–415 carried and carry no names.  The list set out below shows the year of commissioning, year of withdrawal, and the present whereabouts of each locomotive in the class.

Only in 1974, after more than 50 years of service, was the first example of the class withdrawn from service, due to an accident.  However, as early as 1958 the newer locomotives of class Ge 6/6 II began slowly to force the Crocodiles into less demanding services.  The Ge 4/4 II class, delivered from 1973, considerably accelerated this process, so that in 1984 no fewer than six Crocodiles were withdrawn.  After no. 411 was put into storage in June 2001 following an accident — it is now on display in the Deutsches Museum, Munich — only nos. 412, 414 and 415 remained in operation.  They were based in Landquart and Samedan.

Preservation

Six locomotives of the Ge 6/6 I class are still in existence.  Two of them are still in service with the Rhaetian Railway as operational locomotives.

Locomotive no. 402 is on display in the Swiss Transport Museum in Lucerne, no. 406 has been displayed in several places, and is currently at the Kerzers railway museum, and no. 407 is displayed outside Bergün/Bravuogn as part of Albula Railway Museum.

In 2006, on the occasion of the 75th anniversary of the Glacier Express, no. 412, which has since been broken up, was repainted in blue to match the Alpine Pullman Classic.

Nine examples of the class have been scrapped to date: no 401 was broken up in 1975 after an accident, and six others followed after the delivery of the second series of the Ge 4/4 II in 1984.  As the last machines to disappear for the time being, no. 413 and 412 were used in 1996 and 2008 respectively as spare parts donors, and then scrapped.

List of locomotives

References

Literature 
 Claude Jeanmaire: Rhätische Bahn. Stammnetz-Triebfahrzeuge. Villigen AG, 1995.  
 Francesco Pozzato u.a.: Die Krokodile Ge 6/6 I der Rhätischen Bahn. Loki spezial Nr.9, 1995.

External links 

 Railfaneurope.net Picture Gallery

This article is based upon a translation of the German language version as at December 2009.

SLM locomotives
Brown, Boveri & Cie locomotives
Electric locomotives of Switzerland
C+C locomotives
11 kV AC locomotives
Rhaetian Railway locomotives
Railway locomotives introduced in 1921
Metre gauge electric locomotives
C′C′ locomotives